Friedrich Fischer (born 19 July 1908, date of death unknown) was an Austrian long-distance runner. He competed in the men's 5000 metres at the 1936 Summer Olympics.

References

1908 births
Year of death missing
Athletes (track and field) at the 1936 Summer Olympics
Austrian male long-distance runners
Olympic athletes of Austria
Place of birth missing